The Warehouse is the official fan association for Dave Matthews Band.  Founded on December 4, 1998, Warehouse gives members early access to concert tickets, exclusive music and merchandise to its members.  The current fee for membership is $35 per year for US & Canadian members, up from the original price of $30 which remains the cost for International members.

Warehouse is administrated by Musictoday, a Charlottesville, Virginia-based company run by DMB manager Coran Capshaw.  The success of the Warehouse led to Musictoday running similar online fan clubs for other major artists. Musictoday was acquired by major concert promoter Live Nation.

Distribution of Tickets
The primary benefit of Warehouse membership is the opportunity for members to request tickets before they go on sale to the general public.  Warehouse members submit ticket requests during the "request period," which typically lasts two weeks.  These submissions are put into a random lottery and confirmations are often posted prior to the public on-sale date through Ticketmaster, or other outlets.  Finally, seat locations are withheld until after the public on-sale and may not be posted until the tickets ship, a month prior to the concert, in an effort to deter scalping by members.
For the Dave Matthews Band tours from 1999–2001, the allotment of tickets was provided to members via a lottery, weighted toward seniority.  Members who joined in the Warehouse's earlier years got better seat locations than newer members.
In 2002, with the band playing smaller venues, Warehouse adopted a new "random seniority" method.  Seniority then applied to the ticket allotment of some concerts, and not others.  Members were not told in advance which shows will utilize the seniority method, until the pre-sale has been completed and the non-refundable tickets have been paid for.
In 2003, Seniority was not in effect for the Warehouse distribution of tickets for the Dave Matthews and Tim Reynolds acoustic tour.
Later that year, when Dave Matthews Band played a free concert at Central Park in New York, New York, tickets were given to all Warehouse members that requested them, only charging them for postage via FedEx or UPS.  Outside of the Warehouse allotment, few tickets were available to the general public.
Today, Warehouse member ticketing seniority applies to reserved section seat assignments for all events except the first show of a multiple stay at one venue.

Warehouse annual membership packages
Starting in 1999, Warehouse club members received an annual gift package.  Membership packages are mailed to members that joined or renewed in that year.  After the original package in 1999, all membership packages included an exclusive Warehouse CD.  All of these CDs, except for one (see 2001), are Warehouse 5 volumes and contain five live tracks from various tours.  In 2003, the first Warehouse 8 volume was released and distributed to those who had been members for three years or more.  The Warehouse 8 releases have three additional tracks. In 2012, The Warehouse offered more songs by gifting members of four years of more 10 songs, releasing the first Warehouse 10 while new members through three-year members receiving the first volume of Warehouse 7.  Today, all Warehouse members receive 10 tracks + one full concert available by digital download.

2000
This package featured the original "Warehouse 5" CD, black-and-white photo postcards of each band member, and a small poster.

The Warehouse 5

"Crush" (12.07.1998 - Centrum Centre - Worcester, MA)
featuring Butch Taylor
"Warehouse" (12.03.1998 - Madison Square Garden - New York, NY)
featuring Butch Taylor
"#41" (12.08.1998 - Centrum Centre - Worcester, MA)
featuring Butch Taylor, Béla Fleck, and Jeff Coffin
"Say Goodbye" (12.10.1998 - The Palace of Auburn Hills - Auburn Hills, MI)
"Two Step" (12.11.1998 - Kohl Center, University of Wisconsin–Madison -  Madison, WI)

(All songs feature Tim Reynolds)

2001
This package featured an enhanced CD, a poster, and a Warehouse Fan Club bumper sticker. The CD featured videos from the band's studio sessions for Everyday and a music video for "When the World Ends." This is the only release to date that does not contain live tracks.

2002
This package featured "The Warehouse 5 Volume 2" CD, an 8x10 photo of the band, a Warehouse Fan Club sticker, a set of postcards, and coupons for Ben & Jerry's ice cream.

The Warehouse 5 Volume 2

"The Stone" (07.27.2001 - Verizon Wireless Virginia Beach Amphitheater - Virginia Beach, VA)
"When the World Ends" (07.06.2001 - Soldier Field - Chicago, IL)
"Seek Up" (07.30.2001 - Saratoga Performing Arts Center - Saratoga Springs, NY)
"Grace Is Gone" (07.07.2001 - Soldier Field - Chicago, IL)
"Grey Street" (07.07.2001 - Soldier Field - Chicago, IL)

(All songs feature Butch Taylor)

2003
This package featured the "Warehouse 5 Volume 3" CD, an 8x10 photo of the band, a sticker designed by a Warehouse member, and a carabiner key chain with an embroidered Warehouse logo.

Warehouse 5 Volume 3

"Minarets" (08.29.2000 - Saratoga Performing Arts Center - Saratoga Springs, NY)
featuring Butch Taylor
"Recently" (07.13.1999 - ARCO Arena - Sacramento, CA)
"Let You Down" (12.08.1996 - Charleston Civic Center Coliseum - Charleston, WV)
"Typical Situation" (07.16.1999 - The Gorge Amphitheatre - George, WA)
"Halloween" (12.21.2002 - Madison Square Garden - New York, NY)
featuring Butch Taylor

2004
This package featured either the "Warehouse 5 Volume 4" or the "Warehouse 8 Volume 1" CD, an 8x10 photo of the band, and a lenticular mouse pad with two images from live shows.  Members of three or more years were given the "Warehouse 8 Volume 1" disc.

The Warehouse 5 Volume 4 The Warehouse 8 Volume 1

"Best of What's Around" (07.11.2004 - Nissan Pavilion at Stone Ridge - Bristow, VA)
featuring Butch Taylor
"Blue Water"→"JTR" (12.08.2000 - Bryce Jordan Center, The Pennsylvania State University - State College, PA)
"Lover Lay Down" (08.17.1995 - Palmer Auditorium, Palmer College of Chiropractic - Davenport, IA)
"Proudest Monkey" (06.07.1996 - Great Woods Performing Arts Center - Mansfield, MA)
"One Sweet World" (04.20.2002 - Corel Centre - Kanata, Ottawa, Ontario, Canada)
featuring Butch Taylor
"Raven" (07.08.2002 - HiFi Buys Amphitheatre - Atlanta, GA) — Warehouse 8 only
featuring Butch Taylor
"What You Are" (06.30.2003 - Verizon Wireless Music Center - Noblesville, IN) — Warehouse 8 only
featuring Butch Taylor
"I'll Back You Up" (08.05.2004 - Riverbend Music Center - Cincinnati, OH) — Warehouse 8 only
featuring Butch Taylor

2005
This package featured either the "Warehouse 5 Volume 5" or the "Warehouse 8 Volume 2" CD, an 8x10 photo of the band from the 2005 concerts at Red Rocks Amphitheatre in Morrison, CO, and a light-up pen.

Warehouse 5 Volume 5 Warehouse 8 Volume 2

"The Song That Jane Likes" (12.20.2002 - Madison Square Garden - New York, NY)
"Captain" (08.26.2002 - UMB Bank Pavilion - Maryland Heights, MO)
"Rhyme & Reason" (07.10.2004 - Hersheypark Stadium - Hershey, PA)
"Jimi Thing" (07.30.2005 - Randall's Island Park - New York, NY)
featuring Trey Anastasio
"Help Myself" (08.23.2004 - Journal Pavilion - Albuquerque, NM)
featuring Tim Reynolds
"Busted Stuff" (09.10.2000 - HiFi Buys Amphitheatre - Atlanta, GA) — Warehouse 8 only
"Mother Father" (05.18.2001 - Pacific Bell Park - San Francisco, CA) — Warehouse 8 only
featuring The Lovely Ladies, Carlos Santana, and Karl Perazzo
"Angel" (08.03.2001 - Meadows Music Theatre - Hartford, CT) — Warehouse 8 only
featuring The Lovely Ladies and Eric Krasno

(All songs feature Butch Taylor)

2006
This package featured either the "Warehouse 5 Volume 6" or the "Warehouse 8 Volume 3" CD, an 8x10 photo of the band from the 2006 concert in Charlottesville, VA, and a navy-blue gym bag featuring the Warehouse logo.

Warehouse 5 Volume 6 Warehouse 8 Volume 3

"Hello Again" (08.24.2004 - Cricket Pavilion - Phoenix, AZ)
"Steady As We Go" (07.30.2005 - Randall's Island - New York, NY)
"Lie in Our Graves" (04.08.1995 - McAlister Field House, The Citadel - Charleston, SC)
"Pay for What You Get" (09.27.1994 - McIntire Amphitheatre, University of Virginia - Charlottesville, VA)
"Pig" (07.30.2003 - Sleep Train Amphitheatre - Marysville, CA)
"Little Thing" (10.24.1996 - Frank Erwin Center - Austin, TX) — Warehouse 8 only
"#36" (04.08.1995 - McAlister Field House, The Citadel - Charleston, SC) — Warehouse 8 only
"Granny" (08.31.1993 - Trax Night Club - Charlottesville, VA) — Warehouse 8 only

2007
This package featured either the "Warehouse 5 Volume 7" or the "Warehouse 8 Volume 4" CD, 8x10 photo of the band, and deck of cards featuring Firedancer logo.

Warehouse 5 Volume 7 Warehouse 8 Volume 4

"So Right" (07.19.2003 - Verizon Wireless Amphitheater - Selma, TX)
"Joy Ride" (08.26.2004 - Coors Amphitheatre - Chula Vista, CA)
"Digging a Ditch" (07.30.2003 - Sleep Train Amphitheatre - Marysville, CA)
"Big Eyed Fish" (07.28.2002 - Saratoga Performing Arts Center - Saratoga Springs, NY)
"Bartender" (07.28.2002 - Saratoga Performing Arts Center - Saratoga Springs, NY)
"Still Water -> Don't Drink The Water" (05.05.2007 - Hordern Pavilion - Sydney, New South Wales, Australia) — Warehouse 8 only
"Dancing Nancies" (05.08.1995 - Community Theatre - Sacramento, CA) — Warehouse 8 only
"Warehouse" (05.08.1995 - Community Theatre - Sacramento, CA) — Warehouse 8 only

2008
This package included the Warehouse 5 Volume 8 or Warehouse 8 Volume 5, an 8X10 in photo of the band, and four coasters with photos of Under the Table and Dreaming, Crash, Before These Crowded Streets, and Everyday.

Warehouse 5 Volume 8 Warehouse 8 Volume 5

"Pantala Naga Pampa » Rapunzel" (09.22.2006 - John Paul Jones Arena - Charlottesville, VA)
"Loving Wings" (09.01.2007 - The Gorge Amphitheatre - George, WA)
"Drive In, Drive Out" (10.04.1996 - Madison Square Garden - New York, NY)
"Satellite" (07.25.2000 - Mile High Stadium - Denver, CO)
"If I Had It All" (09.13.2006 - Pepsi Center - Denver, CO)
"Break Free" (08.15.2006 - HiFi Buys Amphitheatre - Atlanta, GA) - Warehouse 8 only
"So Much To Say » Anyone Seen The Bridge? »" (08.05.2004 - Riverbend Music Center - Cincinnati, OH) - Warehouse 8 only
"Too Much" (08.05.2004 - Riverbend Music Center - Cincinnati, OH) - Warehouse 8 only

2009
This package included the Warehouse 5 Volume 9 or Warehouse 8 Volume 6, an 8X10 photo of the band, and a Big Whiskey and the GrooGrux King themed magnet.

Warehouse 5 Volume 9 Warehouse 8 Volume 6

"Eh Hee" (10.01.2007 - Hollywood Bowl - Hollywood, CA)
"You Might Die Trying" (08.15.2006 - HiFi Buys Amphitheater - Atlanta, GA)
"Gravedigger" (08.20.2008 - Staples Center - Los Angeles, CA)
"Stolen Away on 55th and 3rd" (09.13.2006 - Pepsi Center - Denver, CO)
"Say Goodbye" (07.05.1997 - Irvine Meadows Amphitheater - Irvine, CA)
"Stay (Wasting Time)" (06.23.2004 - Germain Amphitheater - Columbus, OH) - Warehouse 8 only
"Seven" (09.06.2009 - Gorge Amphitheater - George, WA) - Warehouse 8 only
"Time Bomb" (09.06.2009 - Gorge Amphitheater - George, WA) - Warehouse 8 only

2010
This package included the Warehouse 5 Volume 10 or Warehouse 8 Volume 7, an 8x10 photo of the band, and a copy of Live Trax Vol. 20.

Warehouse 5 Volume 10 Warehouse 8 Volume 7

 "Lying in the Hands of God" (6.6.2009 - Comcast Theatre - Hartford, CT)
 "#40" (6.21.2008 - Saratoga Performing Arts Center - Saratoga Springs, NY)
 "You Never Know" (9.25.2007 - Cricket Pavilion - Phoenix, AZ)
 "#34" (7.9.2005 - Tweeter Center for the Performing Arts - Mansfield, MA)
 "Write a Song" (9.3.2010 - The Gorge Amphitheatre - George, WA)
 "Kit Kat Jam" (8.11.2002 - Verizon Wireless Music Center - Noblesville, IN) - Warehouse 8 only
 "A Dream So Real" (6.21.2008 - Saratoga Performing Arts Center - Saratoga Springs, NY) - Warehouse 8 only
 "Christmas Song (12.20.2002 - Madison Square Garden - New York, NY) - Warehouse 8 only

2011
This package included the Warehouse 5 Volume 11 or Warehouse 8 Volume 8 and a metal key chain with the firedancer logo on it.

Warehouse 5 Volume 11 Warehouse 8 Volume 8

 "Pantala Naga Pampa (Gravedigger Intro) > Rapunzel" (4.26.2002 Allstate Arena, Rosemont, IL)
 "Crazy Easy" (7.16.2004 ctnow.com Meadows Music Theatre, Hartford, CT)
 "Gas Into Fire > What Would You Say" (6.17.2004 UMB Bank Pavilion, Maryland Heights, MO)
 "Old Dirt Hill tease > Why I Am" (4.18.2009 John Paul Jones Arena, Charlottesville, VA)
 "Everyday tease > Halloween > Water Into Wine outro" (8.5.2008 Riverbend Music Center, Cincinnati, OH)
 "Sister" (6.17.2006 Saratoga Performing Arts Center, Saratoga Springs, NY) - Warehouse 8 only
 "So Damn Lucky" (7.14.2010 Montage Mountain, Scranton, PA) - Warehouse 8 only
 "Ants Marching" (8.31.1993 Trax Nightclub, Charlottesville, VA) - Warehouse 8 only

2012
This package included the Warehouse 7 Volume 1 or Warehouse 10 Volume 1, and a set of postcards with pictures of the band performing live. An exclusive photograph was also posted on the Warehouse website for download. It's notable that this is the first disc to feature a track issued for a second time. "Tripping Billies" was also released on the 2007 Summer Tour Sampler.

Warehouse 7 Volume 1 Warehouse 10 Volume 1

 "#27" (09.16.2011 Randall's Island Park, New York, NY)
 "Sugar Will" (03.06.2010 O2 Arena, London, England)
 "Tripping Billies" (08.22.2007 Riverbend Music Center, Cincinnati, OH)
 "Recently" (4.18.2009 John Paul Jones Arena, Charlottesville, VA)
 "The Riff >" (09.07.2012 Cricket Wireless Amphitheatre, Chula Vista, CA)
 "You & Me" (09.07.2012 Cricket Wireless Amphitheatre, Chula Vista, CA)
 "Snow Outside" (09.09.2012 Shoreline Amphitheatre, Mountain View, CA)
 "Typical Situation" (09.19.2007 Verizon Wireless Amphitheatre, Charlotte, NC) - Warehouse 10 only
 "The Dreaming Tree" (8.31.2007 The Gorge Amphitheatre, George, WA) - Warehouse 10 only
 "Kill The King" (06.06.2006 DTE Energy Music Theatre, Clarkston, MI) - Warehouse 10 only

2013
The membership package also includes a set of custom DMB Fire Dancer ear buds. An exclusive photograph will be posted on the Warehouse website for download. Members that hit their 15-year mark in 2013 also receive a ticket collector album.

Warehouse 7 Volume 2 Warehouse 10 Volume 2

 "Good Good Time" (7.10.2004 Hersheypark, Stadium, Hershey, PA)
 "Belly Belly Nice" (9.7.2012 Cricket Wireless Amphitheater, Chula Vista, CA with Lasim Richards)
 "Lie In Our Graves >" (9.27.1994 McIntire Amphitheatre, Charlottesville, VA)
 "Minarets" (9.27.1994 McIntire Amphitheatre, Charlottesville, VA)
 "Lover Lay Down" (10.29.1998 San Jose Arena, San Jose, CA)
 "Rooftop" (5.22.2013 Austin360 Amphitheater, Austin TX)
 "Blue Water > Drunken Soldier" (6.26.2013 Nikon at Jones Beach Theater, Wantagh, NY)
 "Warehouse" (9.20.2000 Sandstone Amphitheater, Bonner Springs, KS) - Warehouse 10 only
 "Spoon" (6.22.2013 Klipsch Music Center, Noblesville, IN with Brandi Carlile) - Warehouse 10 only
 "Drive In Drive Out" (9.17.2011 DMB Caravan: Randall's Island Park New York, NY) - Warehouse 10 only

2014
This package included the Warehouse 7 Volume 3 or Warehouse 10 Volume 3, a Warehouse portable mobile phone charger, and an exclusive photograph will be posted on the Warehouse website soon for download. Members that hit their 15-year mark in 2014 will also receive a ticket collector album.

Warehouse 7 Volume 3 Warehouse 10 Volume 3

 "Dive In" (6.13.2009 Saratoga Performing Arts Center, Saratoga Springs, NY)
 "Let You Down (Acoustic)" (2.01.1997 Eisenhower Hall, West Point, NY)
 "Stolen Away On 55th and 3rd (Acoustic)" (7.26.2014 Jiffy Lube Live, Bristow, VA)
 "Proudest Monkey" (5.30.2014 Saratoga Performing Arts Center, Saratoga Springs, NY)
 "Baby Blue" (8.14.2010 InTrust Bank Arena, Wichita, KS)
 "Pay For What You Get (Acoustic)" (5.31.2014 Saratoga Performing Arts Center, Saratoga Springs, NY)
 "Butterfly" (9.23.2006 John Paul Jones Arena, Charlottesville, VA)
 "Dancing Nancies" (6.05.2009 Comcast Theatre, Hartford, CT) - Warehouse 10 only
 "Jimi Thing (Acoustic)" (2.1.1997 Eisenhower Hall, West Point, NY) - Warehouse 10 only
 "Say Goodbye" (7.31.1998 Meadows Music Theatre, Hartford, CT) - Warehouse 10 only

2015
This package included the Warehouse 7 Volume 4 or Warehouse 10 Volume 4, The Warehouse Annual Membership Package will also include a tote bag. Our fifteen year members, those who joined in 2000, will also receive the Warehouse Ticket Collector Album. An exclusive, downloadable acoustic/electric b&w/color photos of the band will be available for download as well.

Warehouse 7 Volume 4 Warehouse 10 Volume 4

 "Oh (Acoustic)" (6.6.2014  Darling's Waterfront Pavilion, Bangor, ME)
 "Joy Ride" (6.24.2006 Nissan Pavilion at Stone Ridge, Bristow, VA)
 "Broken Things" (5.31.2013 First Niagara Pavilion, Burgettstown, PA)
 "Sweet Up and Down" (8.8.2007 Tweeter Center at the Waterfront, Camden, NJ)
 "I Did It" (9.15.2010 Xcel Energy Center, Saint Paul, MN)
 "The Space Between" (6.27.2015 Saratoga Performing Arts Center, Saratoga Springs, NY)
 "Seek Up" (9.2.2007 The Gorge Amphitheatre, George, WA)
 "Shotgun" (9.23.2006 John Paul Jones Arena, Charlottesville, VA) - Warehouse 10 only
 "Don't Burn The Pig" (8.31.1996 Nissan Pavilion at Stone Ridge, Bristow, VA) - Warehouse 10 only
 "Granny" (8.31.1996 Nissan Pavilion at Stone Ridge, Bristow, VA) - Warehouse 10 only

2016
This package included the Warehouse 7 Volume 5 or Warehouse 10 Volume 5, The Warehouse Annual Membership Package will also include a flag. Our fifteen year members, those who joined in 2001, will also receive the Warehouse Ticket Collector Album. An exclusive, downloadable acoustic/electric b&w/color photos of the band will be available for download as well.

Warehouse 7 Volume 5 Warehouse 10 Volume 5

 "American Baby Intro" (7.30.2005 Randall's Island Park, New York, NY)
 "American Baby" (7.30.2005 Randall's Island Park, New York, NY)
 "Dreamgirl" (8.20.2005 The Gorge Amphitheatre, George, WA)
 "Get In Line" (11.8.1994 Lisner Auditorium, Washington, DC)
 "Crash Into Me" (7.20.2004 Tweeter Center At The Waterfront, Camden, NJ)
 "Bartender>>Don't Drink The Water" (3.14.1999 Marin Veterans’ Memorial Auditorium, San Rafael, CA)
 "The Last Stop" (9.12.2006 Pepsi Center, Denver, CO)
 "People, People" (11.24.1992 Trax, Charlottesville, VA) - Warehouse 10 only
 "Cry Freedom" (11.8.1994 Lisner Auditorium, Washington, DC) - Warehouse 10 only
 "Dodo" (12.11.2010 Theater For The Performing Arts, Las Vegas, NV) - Warehouse 10 only

2017
With Warehouse member participation, the track listings for both 2017 & 2018 CDs reflect the top 20 songs chosen by Warehouse members during the song selection survey conducted in August 2017.

Warehouse 7 Volume 6 Warehouse 10 Volume 6

 "Big Eyed Fish" (7.25.2001 AmSouth Amphitheatre, Antioch, TN)
 "Bartender" (7.25.2001 AmSouth Amphitheatre, Antioch, TN)
 "Dancing Nancies" (6.23.2006 Hersheypark Stadium, Hershey, PA)
 "Warehouse" (6.23.2006 Hersheypark Stadium, Hershey, PA)
 "The Dreaming Tree" (6.23.2006 Hersheypark Stadium, Hershey, PA)
 "Broken Things" (12.11.2012 The Arena at Gwinnett Center, Duluth, GA)
 "Don't Burn The Pig" (4.4.2002 MCI Center Washington, DC)
 "The Stone" (6.13.2009 Saratoga Springs Arts Center, Saratoga Springs, NY) - Warehouse 10 only
 "Crush" (6.24.2008 Comcast Center Mansfield, MA) - Warehouse 10 only
 "Two Step" (7.29.2002 Saratoga Springs Arts Center, Saratoga Springs, NY) - Warehouse 10 only

2018
With Warehouse member participation, the track listings for both 2017 & 2018 CDs reflect the top 20 songs chosen by Warehouse members during the song selection survey conducted in August 2017.

Warehouse 7 Volume 7 Warehouse 10 Volume 7

 "Drive In, Drive Out" (6.22.1997 Riverbend Music Center, Cincinnati, OH)
 "Lover Lay Down" (7.5.2006 Toyota Pavilion at Montage Mountain, Scranton, PA)
 "Fool To Think" (6.23.2012 Klipsch Music Center, Noblesville, IN)
 "Angel" (7.25.2001 AmSouth Amphitheatre, Antioch, TN)
 "Pay For What You Get" (8.24.2003 Continental Airlines Arena, E Rutherford, NJ)
 "Tripping Billies" (8.31.1993 Trax, Charlottesville, VA)
 "Ants Marching" (8.29.1995 Mann Center for the Performing Arts, Philadelphia, PA)
 "Digging A Ditch" (7.5.2006 Toyota Pavilion at Montage Mountain, Scranton, PA) - Warehouse 10 only
 "Grey Street" (12.10.2002 St. Pete Times Forum, Tampa, FL) - Warehouse 10 only
 "Why I Am" (6.23.2012 Klipsch Music Center, Noblesville, IN) - Warehouse 10 only

2019
This package includes Warehouse 7, Volume 8 or Warehouse 10, Volume 8 and a Warehouse ticket magnet, commemorating the 2018 Tour. To celebrate the 15-year anniversary of the Warehouse, members that joined the Warehouse in 2004 and have renewed consecutively for 15 years will also receive a commemorative ticket album. The annual 8x10 photo was taken by Rodrigo Simas at TD Garden on 12.7.18. The Warehouse Members-Only CD contains 7 tracks (10 tracks for members who have been with the Warehouse for four or more years).

Warehouse 7 Volume 8 Warehouse 10 Volume 8

 "Hello Again" (06.06.2018 DTE Energy Music Theatre, Clarkston, MI)
 "She" (08.28.2018 Les Schwab Amphitheater Bend, OR)
 "One Sweet World" (06.06.2018 DTE Energy Music Theatre, Clarkston, MI)
 "Minarets" (08.31.2018 The Gorge Amphitheatre, George, WA)
 "#27" (06.07.2018 Riverbend Music Center, Cincinnati, OH)
 "Old Dirt Hill (Bring That Beat Back)" (08.31.2018 The Gorge Amphitheatre, George, WA)
 "You Might Die Trying" (06.06.2018 DTE Energy Music Theatre, Clarkston, MI)
 "Lover Lay Down" (08.28.2018 Les Schwab Amphitheater Bend, OR) - Warehouse 10 only
 "Why I Am" (08.28.2018 Les Schwab Amphitheater Bend, OR) - Warehouse 10 only
 "Everyday" (08.28.2018 Les Schwab Amphitheater Bend, OR) - Warehouse 10 only

2020
This package included either the Warehouse 7 Volume 9, or Warehouse 10 Volume 9 CD and a Warehouse bottle opener keychain. Members could choose from a CD or digital download. Members that joined the Warehouse in 2005 and have renewed consecutively for 15 years will also receive a commemorative ticket album. Members that joined the Warehouse in 2000 and have renewed consecutively for 20 years will also receive an exclusive Dave Matthews Band Warehouse poster. The annual 8x10 photo was taken by Rodrigo Simas at Arena Monterrey on 10.8.19. The Warehouse Members-Only CD contains 7 tracks (10 tracks for members who have been with the Warehouse for four or more years).

Warehouse 7 Volume 9 Warehouse 10 Volume 9

 "Mercy" (03.06.2019 Zenith, Munich, Germany)
 "Satellite" (03.06.2019 Zenith, Munich, Germany)
 "Minarets" (04.01.2019 Unipol Arena, Bologna, Italy)
 "Virginia In The Rain" (04.20.2019 Volvo Car Stadium, Charleston, SC)
 "Raven" (04.30.2019 Pensacola Bay Center, Pensacola, FL)
 "Again And Again" (05.07.2019 Oak Mountain Amphitheatre, Pelham, AL)
 "Rooftop" (07.02.2019 Riverbend Music Center, Cincinnati, OH)
 "JTR" (07.13.2019 Saratoga Performing Arts Center, Saratoga Springs, NY) - Warehouse 10 only
 "Kill The Preacher > Grace Is Gone" (07.13.2019 Saratoga Performing Arts Center, Saratoga Springs, NY) - Warehouse 10 only
 "Spoon" (08.24.2019 Fiddler's Green Amphitheatre, Greenwood Village, CO) - Warehouse 10 only

2021
The 2021 Warehouse track list is The Warehouse Session in its entirety; a special performance by Dave & Carter from the Haunted Hollow Studio which was a recent video stream to Warehouse members only. The 2020 annual Warehouse 8x10 photo was taken by Sanjay Suchak at The Chelsea at The Cosmopolitan in Las Vegas on February 28, 2020.

In line with Dave Matthews Band’s mission to minimize environmental impacts, the Warehouse member package is 100% digital in 2021 and future years. The annual exclusive music and photo will be downloadable only. In lieu of a gift item, Warehouse members will receive one DMB concert download per year.

Warehouse Volume 10

 "Out Of My Hands"
 "Grace Is Gone"
 "I'll Back You Up"
 "Say Goodbye"
 "Pay For What You Get"
 "Grey Street"
 "Lover Lay Down"
 "Gravedigger"
 "Satellite"
 "Halloween"

9.7.2019 Golden 1 Credit Union Center, Sacramento, CA

 "Why I Am"
 "Bartender"
 "Do You Remember"
 "Warehouse"
 "Again and Again"
 "Grey Street"
 "Drunken Soldier"
 "Louisiana Bayou"
 "Rooftop"
 "Typical Situation"
 "Shake Me Like a Monkey"
 "Come Tomorrow"
 "Corn Bread"
 "Can't Stop"
 "The Space Between"
 "The Song That Jane Likes"
 "Water into Wine"
 "Everyday"
 "Ants Marching"
 "Granny"
 "Stay (Wasting Time)"

2022
This year's Warehouse photo was taken by Sanjay Suchak on August 7, 2021 at Huntington Bank Pavilion in Chicago, IL and was available for digital download only

Warehouse Volume 11

 "#40" (10.9.2021 Fiddler's Green Amphitheatre, Greenwood Village, CO)
 "Beach Ball" (5.26.2012 Xfinity Theatre, Hartford, CT)
 "Stay or Leave" (9.11.2021 FivePoint Amphitheatre, Irvine, CA)
 "Black and Blue Bird" (7.31.2015 iTHINK Financial Amphitheatre, West Palm Beach, FL)
 "Spaceman" > (9.4.2015 Gorge Amphitheatre, George, WA)
 "Cornbread" (9.4.2015 Gorge Amphitheatre, George, WA)
 "Minarets" > (11.8.1994 Lisner Auditorium, Washington, DC)
 "Typical Situation" > (11.8.1994 Lisner Auditorium, Washington, DC)
 "#36" > (11.8.1994 Lisner Auditorium, Washington, DC)
 "Ants Marching" (11.8.1994 Lisner Auditorium, Washington, DC)

8.25.2021 Bank of New Hampshire Pavilion, Gilford, NH

 "When the World Ends"
 "Granny"
 "What Would You Say"
 "Sweet"
 "The Song That Jane Likes"
 "Samurai Cop (Oh Joy Begin)"
 "Pig"
 "Seek Up"
 "Sledgehammer"
 "Everyday"
 "Gravedigger"
 "So Damn Lucky"
 "Write a Song"
 "Crush"
 "Digging a Ditch"
 "Minarets"
 "Stay (Wasting Time)"
 "Ants Marching"
 "Sister"
 "Tripping Billies"

2023
All 2023 Warehouse memberships will receive a download of the Dave Matthews Band concert on 4.25.2009 at Vanderbilt Stadium in Nashville, TN. To accompany the concert, members will receive a Warehouse Vol. 12 download.

Warehouse Volume 12

 "Samurai Cop" (8.20.22 iTHINK Financial Amphitheatre, West Palm Beach, FL)
 "Can’t Stop" (9.3.22 The Gorge Amphitheatre, George, WA)
 "Do You Remember" (6.11.22 Jiffy Lube Live, Bristow, VA)
 "#41" (7.12.22 Bank of New Hampshire Pavilion, Gilford, NH)
 "So Right" (7.12.22 Bank of New Hampshire Pavilion, Gilford, NH)
 "Louisiana Bayou" (6.21.22 Pine Knob Music Theatre, Clarkston, MI)
 "So Damn Lucky" (7.13.22 Bank of New Hampshire Pavilion, Gilford, NH)
 "Squirm" (9.3.22 The Gorge Amphitheatre, George, WA
 "Break For It" (7.13.22 Bank of New Hampshire Pavilion, Gilford, NH)
 "Break Free" (6.29.22 PNC Bank Art Center, Holmdel, NJ)

4.25.2009 Vanderbilt Stadium, Nashville, TN

 "Bartender"
 "Grey Street"
 "The Last Stop [tease]»"
 "Satellite"
 "Seek Up"
 "Burning Down the House"
 "Why I Am"
 "Anyone Seen the Bridge»"
 "Too Much [fake]»"
 "Ants Marching"
 "You Might Die Trying"
 "Recently"
 "Crash into Me"
 "Spaceman»"
 "Corn Bread"
 "Funny the Way It Is"
 "Jimi Thing"
 "Two Step"
 "Blue Water»"
 "All Along the Watchtower"

Warehouse Pre-Order Bonus Discs
The MusicToday Dave Matthews Band store has recently begun to offer bonus discs to all customers who pre-order a release.  Warehouse members who pre-order albums through the Warehouse-only section of the same store are typically given the added benefit of additional tracks on their bonus discs.

Live at... A Limited Edition Companion to Some Devil (2003)
This bonus disc features live acoustic tracks by Dave Matthews and Tim Reynolds from their Spring 2003 Tour, and was included with all pre-orders of Some Devil.  Pre-orders through the Warehouse store were given a disc with an additional two songs, tracks eight and nine.  A second pressing of the nine-track CD was made for orders of the 2004 Dave Matthews Band calendar.  A version containing only the first five tracks was included in the deluxe version of the album.

"Grey Street" (04.03.2003 - Elliott Hall of Music, Purdue University - West Lafayette, IN)
"When the World Ends" (03.28.2003 - Lawrence Joel Veterans Memorial Coliseum - Winston-Salem, NC)
"Jimi Thing" (03.22.2003 - Radio City Music Hall - New York, NY)
"Stay or Leave" (04.03.2003 - Elliott Hall of Music, Purdue University - West Lafayette, IN)
"Seek Up" (03.20.2003 - Ryan Center, University of Rhode Island - Kingston, RI)
"Crush" (03.28.2003 - Lawrence Joel Veterans Memorial Coliseum - Winston-Salem, NC)
"Drive In Drive Out" (03.20.2003 - Ryan Center, University of Rhode Island - Kingston, RI)
"Cry Freedom" (04.04.2003 - Physical Education Center, Carthage College - Kenosha, WI) — Warehouse Pre-Orders Only
"Dancing Nancies" (04.04.2003 - Physical Education Center, Carthage College - Kenosha, WI) — Warehouse Pre-Orders Only

Live at... A Limited Edition Companion to The Central Park Concert (2003)
This bonus disc was included with all pre-orders of The Central Park Concert and provides selected highlights from the band's Summer 2003 Tour.  Butch Taylor is featured on all songs.  No additional tracks were given to Warehouse members.

"Bartender" (07.22.2003 - USANA Amphitheatre - West Valley, UT)
"You Never Know" (07.09.2003  Target Center - Minneapolis, MN)
"The Dreaming Tree" (07.30.2003 - Sleep Train Amphitheatre - Marysville, CA)
"True Reflections" (07.22.2003 - USANA Amphitheatre - West Valley, UT)
"Spoon" (09.14.2003 - Verizon Wireless Virginia Beach Amphitheater - Virginia Beach, VA)
"Everyday" (09.11.2003 - Hersheypark Stadium - Hershey, PA)
"The Last Stop" (08.08.2003 - The Gorge Amphitheatre - George, WA)

A Limited Edition Companion to Stand Up (2005)
This five-track bonus disc was included with all pre-orders of Stand Up.  The disc blends studio B-sides with various live selections from the band's Summer 2004 Tour.  Pre-orders through the Warehouse store were given a disc with an additional three songs: tracks six, seven, and eight.

"Joyride"
"Trouble With You"
"Recently" (07.13.2004 - Darien Lake Performing Arts Center - Darien Center, NY)
"Crash Into Me" (07.20.2004 - Tweeter Center at the Waterfront - Camden, NJ)
"Hello Again" (07.29.2004 - Ford Amphitheatre - Tampa, FL)
"Sugar Will" (09.03.2004 - The Gorge Amphitheatre - George, WA) — Warehouse Pre-Orders Only
"Typical Situation" (09.04.2004 - The Gorge Amphitheatre - George, WA) — Warehouse Pre-Orders Only
"Mark and Carter Jam"  — Warehouse Pre-Orders Only

The Best of What's Around Vol. 1 Encore CD (2006)
This bonus disc was included with all pre-orders of The Best of What's Around Vol. 1.  No additional tracks were provided to Warehouse members.

"Minarets" (08.31.1995 - Great Woods - Mansfield, MA)
"#41" (04.20.2002 - Corel Centre - Ottawa, Ontario, Canada)
featuring Butch Taylor and Béla Fleck and the Flecktones
"What You Are" (06.16.2006 - Saratoga Performing Arts Center - Saratoga, NY)
featuring Butch Taylor and Rashawn Ross
"The Last Stop" (06.20.2003 - Darien Lake Performing Arts Center - Darien Center, NY)
featuring Butch Taylor

Europe 07 (2007)
The Europe 07 bonus disc was included for those that pre-ordered the Live at Radio City Dave Matthews and Tim Reynolds release.  This disc gave eight tracks of the Dave Matthews and Tim Reynolds 2007 tour of Europe.  No additional tracks were given to Warehouse members, but people who didn't order the CD/DVD combo only received a disc containing the first four tracks.

"Satellite" (03.14.2007 - Vega - Copenhagen, Denmark)
"Say Goodbye" (03.02.2007 - New Theatre - Oxford, England)
"I'll Back You Up" (03.02.2007 - New Theatre - Oxford, England)
"Can't Stop" (02.24.2007 - Scottish Exhibition & Conference Centre - Glasgow, Scotland)
"Smooth Rider" (02.23.2007 - Newcastle City Hall - Newcastle upon Tyne, England) — CD/DVD combo Pre-Orders Only
"Dodo" (02.26.2007 - National Stadium - Dublin, Ireland) — CD/DVD combo Pre-Orders Only
"Everyday" (03.12.2007 - Columbiahalle - Berlin, Germany) — CD/DVD combo Pre-Orders Only
"Crash Into Me" (03.12.2007 - Columbiahalle - Berlin, Germany) — CD/DVD combo Pre-Orders Only

2007 Summer Tour Sampler (2007)
A bonus disc was included in pre-orders of Live at Piedmont Park. If the CD or DVD were ordered individually, four tracks were included on the bonus disc.  If the CD/DVD combo was ordered, an eight track disc was included. All tracks originate from the Dave Matthews Band Summer 2007 tour.

"Sweet Up and Down" (08.11.2007 - Nissan Pavilion - Bristow, VA)
"Tripping Billies" (08.22.2007 - Riverbend Music Center - Cincinnati, OH)
"Grace Is Gone" » "Black Water" (09.25.2007 - Cricket Pavilion - Phoenix, AZ)
"American Baby Intro" (08.26.2007 - Alpine Valley Music Theatre - East Troy, WI)
"Shotgun" (08.26.2007 - Alpine Valley Music Theatre - East Troy, WI) — CD/DVD combo Pre-Orders Only
"Out of My Hands" (08.02.2007 - Tweeter Center for the Performing Arts - Mansfield, MA) — CD/DVD combo Pre-Orders Only
"Stand Up (For It)" (09.19.2007 - Verizon Wireless Amphitheatre - Charlotte, NC) — CD/DVD combo Pre-Orders Only
"Some Devil" (08.14.2007 - Saratoga Performing Arts Center - Saratoga Springs, NY) — CD/DVD combo Pre-Orders Only

Live Trax 2008
These tracks were available for free iTunes download for those who purchased tickets for the 2008 summer tour through Ticketmaster or The Warehouse.

"Eh Hee" (06.24.2008 - Comcast Center - Mansfield, MA)
"So Damn Lucky" (06.28.2008 - Nissan Pavilion - Bristow, VA)
"Crush" (06.10.2008 - Toyota Pavilion - Scranton, PA)
"The Dreaming Tree" (06.21.2008 - Saratoga Performing Arts Center - Saratoga Springs, NY)
"Pay for What You Get" (06.10.2008 - Toyota Pavilion - Scranton, PA)
"Proudest Monkey" (06.24.2008 - Comcast Center - Mansfield, MA)
"Bartender" (08.19.2008 - Staples Center - Los Angeles, CA)
"Tripping Billies" (08.10.2008 - Alpine Valley Music Theatre - East Troy, WI)

Double Down (2010)
This disc was given to those who pre-ordered the Dave and Tim CD "Live in Las Vegas".  A 4-track version was included in the order and a special 8-track version was given to members of the Warehouse.

"The Stone" (12.11.2009)
"Cornbread" (12.11.2009)
"Gravedigger" (12.10.2009)
"Rye Whiskey" (12.11.2009)
"#27" (12.11.2009) "Warehouse Pre-Order Only"
"Spaceman" (12.10.2009) "Warehouse Pre-Order Only"
"The Wayfarer" (12.10.2009) "Warehouse Pre-Order Only"
"Time Bomb" (12.10.2009) "Warehouse Pre-Order Only"

Big Apple Bonus Disc (2010)
This disc was given to those who pre-ordered the album "Live in New York City".  All songs were recorded on 7.16.2010

"Why I Am"
"Grey Street"
"Time Bomb"
"So Damn Lucky"
"Big Eyed Fish" (Warehouse only)
"Pantala Naga Pampa > Rapunzel" (Warehouse only)
"#41" (Warehouse only)
"Little Red Bird" (Warehouse only)

Greetings From Bader Field (2011)
This disc was given to those who pre-ordered the album "Live in Atlantic City".  Songs were recorded on 6.24.2011 & 6.25.2011.

"Squirm"
"You Might Die Trying"
"Satellite"
"Corn Bread"
"Spaceman" (Warehouse only)
"Write a Song" (Warehouse only)
"Seven" (Warehouse only)
"Sister" (Warehouse only)

2012 Summer Tour Sampler (2012)
Fans who pre-ordered Away From the World, received a bonus disc with live songs from the 2012 Summer tour. Members of the Warehouse received a disc with eight tracks and non-members received only the first five.

"Save Me" (06.02.2012 - Molson Canadian Amphitheatre - Toronto, CAN)
"You Never Know" (06.08.2012 - SPAC - Saratoga Springs, NY)
"Jimi Thing" (05.22.2012 - Aaron's Amphitheater at Lakewood - Atlanta, GA)
"Halloween" (06.06.2012 - Comcast Center - Mansfield, MA)
"Tripping Billies" (06.06.2012 - Comcast Center - Mansfield, MA)
"Mansfield Jam -> Why I Am" (06.05.2012 - Comcast Center - Mansfield, MA) (Warehouse Only) 
"Time Bomb" (06.24.2012 - Harriet Island - Saint Paul, MN) (Warehouse Only)
"Two Step" (06.24.2012 - Harriet Island - Saint Paul, MN) (Warehouse Only)

Encore Trax: JPJ Extended (2013)
Fans who pre-ordered Live Trax Vol. 28, received a bonus disc with live songs from November 20, 2010 at John Paul Jones Arena in Charlottesville, VA. Members of the Warehouse received a disc with eight tracks and non-members received only the first five.

"You Might Die Trying" 
"Proudest Monkey" 
"Satellite" 
"Say Goodbye" 
"Song That Jane Likes"
"Why I Am" (Warehouse Only) 
"Granny" (Warehouse Only)
"#40 > The Last Stop" (Warehouse Only)

Encore Trax: The Greek Extended (2014)
Fans who pre-ordered Live Trax Vol. 32, received a bonus disc with live songs from August 22, 2014 at William Randolph Hearst Greek Theater in Berkeley, CA. Members of the Warehouse received a disc with eight tracks and non-members received only the first five.

"Bartender" 
"Typical Situation" 
"You Might Die Trying" 
"Spaceman" 
"Drive In, Drive Out"
"Loving Wings" (Warehouse Only) 
"Tripping Billies" (Warehouse Only)
"What Would You Say" (Warehouse Only)

Encore Trax: Alpine Valley Extended (2015)
Fans who pre-ordered Live Trax Vol. 36, received a bonus disc with live songs from July 25, 2015 at Alpine Valley Music Theatre in Elkhorn, WI. Members of the Warehouse received a disc with eight tracks and non-members received only the first five.

"Little Red Bird (Acoustic)" 
"The Song That Jane Likes (Full Band Acoustic)" 
"Pig" 
"Big Eyed Fish" 
"Lie In Our Graves"
"Captain" (Warehouse Only) 
"Lying In The Hands Of God" (Warehouse Only)
"Drive In, Drive Out" (Warehouse Only)

Encore Trax: 2002 Holiday Tour (2016)
Fans who pre-ordered Live Trax Vol. 40, received a bonus disc with live songs from Madison Square Garden in New York, NY recorded on December 22, 2002. Members of the Warehouse received a disc with eight tracks and non-members received only the first five.

"Don't Drink The Water"
"You Never Know"
"Everyday"
"The Stone"
"Loving Wings"
"What You Are" (Warehouse Only) 
"Warehouse" (Warehouse Only)
"Christmas Song" (Warehouse Only)

Encore Trax: The Gorge Extended (2017)
Fans who pre-ordered Live Trax Vol. 44, received a bonus disc with live songs from the 2016 weekend at The Gorge. Members of the Warehouse received a disc with eight tracks and non-members received only the first five.

"Big Eyed Fish" (09.02.2016 - The Gorge Amphitheatre - George, WA)
"Satellite" (09.02.2016 - The Gorge Amphitheatre - George, WA)
"Granny" (09.03.2016 - Gorge Amphitheatre - George, WA)
"Recently" (09.02.2016 - The Gorge Amphitheatre - George, WA)
"Cry Freedom" (09.02.2016 - Gorge Amphitheatre - George, WA)
"Rooftop" (09.03.2016 - Gorge Amphitheatre - George, WA) (Warehouse Only) 
"One Sweet World" (09.03.2016 - Gorge Amphitheatre - George, WA) (Warehouse Only)
"Why I Am" (09.02.2016 - The Gorge Amphitheatre - George, WA) (Warehouse Only)

A Limited Edition Companion To Come Tomorrow (2018) 
Given to fans who pre-ordered Come Tomorrow released on June 8, 2018. Members of the Warehouse received a disc including ten tracks and non-members received a disc featuring only the first seven tracks.

"So Right" (07.02.2016 - Alpine Valley Music Theatre - Elkhorn, WI)
"Beach Ball" (07.20.2012 - Cruzan Amphitheatre - West Palm Beach, FL)
"#34" (08.31.2013 - The Gorge Amphitheatre - George, WA)
"Why I Am" (04.25.2009 - Vanderbilt Stadium - Nashville, TN)
"Minarets" (06.22.1997 - Riverbend Music Center - Cincinnati, OH)
"Little Thing" (09.28.1996 - Gund Arena - Cleveland, OH) 
"Alligator Pie" (02.03.2018 - Xcel Energy Center - St. Paul, MN) 
"#40" (06.22.2000 - Deer Creek Music Center - Noblesville, IN) (Warehouse Only)
"Rhyme & Reason" (07.02.2004 - Saratoga Performing Arts Center - Saratoga Springs, NY) (Warehouse Only)
"Drunken Soldier" (08.30.2013 - The Gorge Amphitheatre - George, WA) (Warehouse Only)

Encore Trax: Summer Tour 2018 Extended (2018) 
Provided exclusively to Warehouse fan club members who had pre-ordered Live Trax Vol. 46 release. The Warehouse Edition of the Bonus Disc contains 8 tracks, while there is another version of this Bonus Disc only containing 5 tracks that was provided for non-fan club members who had pre-ordered Live Trax Vol. 46 release.

"Do You Remember" (06.09.2018 at Jiffy Lube Live, Bristow, VA)
"Louisiana Bayou" (06.12.2018 at Bank of New Hampshire Pavilion, Gilford, NH)
"Idea Of You" (06.07.2018 at Riverbend Music Center, Cincinnati, OH)
"Seven" (06.06.2018 at DTE Energy Music Theatre, Clarkston, MI)
"Samauri Cop (Oh Joy Begin)" (08.28.2018 at Les Schwab Amphitheatre, Bend, OR)
"Digging A Ditch" (06.29.2018 at Huntington Bank Pavilion at Northerly Island, Chicago, IL) (Warehouse Only)
"Again And Again" (08.28.2018 at Les Schwab Amphitheatre, Bend, OR) (Warehouse Only)
"Stand Up" (05.30.2018 at Walmart Arkansas Music Pavilion, Rogers, AR) (Warehouse Only)

External links 
Official DMB Warehouse Site

Dave Matthews Band